Theodor Ludwig Greiner was a German-born lawyer who held democratic beliefs.  Thus, he became a member of the Palatinate Provisional Government in 1849. After the government was crushed by the Prussian counter-revolutionary authorities, Greiner fled to Switzerland and then to the United States.

References 

German revolutionaries
People of the Revolutions of 1848
German-American Forty-Eighters
Members of the Bavarian Chamber of Deputies